Podgorskoye is a rural locality (a selo) in Krasnogvardeysky District, Belgorod Oblast, Russia. The population was 138 as of 2010. There is 1 street.

Geography 
Podgorskoye is located 19 km west of Biryuch (the district's administrative centre) by road. Vesyoloye is the nearest rural locality.

References 

Rural localities in Krasnogvardeysky District, Belgorod Oblast